David Olsen may refer to:
David A. Olsen (1937–2009), chairman of brokerage firm Johnson & Higgins
David S. Olsen (born 1988), Republican member of the Illinois House of Representatives
David Olsen (soccer) (born 1996), American soccer player

See also
David Olson (disambiguation)